Jizhou may refer to:

Jizhou District, Hengshui, Hebei
Jizhou Town, subdivision of Jizhou District, Hengshui
Jizhou District, Ji'an, Jiangxi
Jizhou District, Tianjin

Historical locations
Ji Province, one of the Nine Provinces in ancient China
Ji Prefecture (Shandong), a prefecture in modern Gansu, China between the 10th and 14th centuries

See also
Jeju (disambiguation) — Korean equivalent
Ji (disambiguation)